was a Japanese politician who served as Minister of Finance in the first Cabinet of Shinzō Abe, from 2001 to 2007.

Omi was born in Numata, Gunma Prefecture and graduated with a degree in Commerce from Hitotsubashi University. He joined the Ministry of International Trade and Industry and later served as consul general of Japan in New York City and as Director of the Small Business Administration. He resigned from the bureaucracy in 1982 to run for office, and was elected to the Diet of Japan in 1983.

Omi was appointed Director of the Economic Planning Agency in 1997 and briefly as a state minister under Junichiro Koizumi in 2001. He was on a mission to the United States during the September 11, 2001 attacks. He was Minister of Science and Technology 2001–2002, as well as Minister of State for Okinawa and Northern Territories Affairs. He was appointed Minister of Finance on 26 September 2006.He was conferred an Honorary Doctorate in Public Service by the University of Cambodia in 2007 and by the Okinawa Institute of Science and Technology in 2018.

Omi supported increases in the national consumption tax, although Abe distanced himself from this policy and sought to achieve much of his budget balancing through spending cuts. Omi died on 14 April 2022, at the age of 89.

Later work
Founder and Chairman, Science and Technology in Society Forum Okinawa Institute of Science and Technology board member from 2014 to 2021.

References

|-

|-

|-

|-

1932 births
2022 deaths
21st-century Japanese politicians
Liberal Democratic Party (Japan) politicians
People from Gunma Prefecture
Hitotsubashi University alumni
Members of the House of Representatives (Japan)
Government ministers of Japan
Ministers of Finance of Japan
Economic planning ministers of Japan
Members of the House of Representatives from Gunma Prefecture